Latvia competed at the 2008 Summer Paralympics in Beijing, People's Republic of China.

Medallists

Sports

Athletics

Men's field

Women's track

Women's field

Judo

Men's

Powerlifting

Men's

Volleyball

The Latvian women's volleyball team didn't win any medals; they were 7th out of 8 teams.

Players
Ināra Barkāne
Una Dzalba
Ivonna Gailīte
Oksana Gromova
Diāna Ivanova
Olga Jegorova
Irina Jermoļenko
Līga Kārliete
Mārīte Pudāne
Nellija Rusiņa
Linda Sila
Žanna Škutāne

Tournament
Group B matches

5-8th Semifinals

7-8th Classification

See also
Latvia at the Paralympics
Latvia at the 2008 Summer Olympics

External links
Beijing 2008 Paralympic Games Official Site
International Paralympic Committee
Latvian Paralympic Committee

Nations at the 2008 Summer Paralympics
2008
Paralympics